Adrien Rommel (4 August 1914 – 21 June 1963) was a French fencer. He won a gold medal in the team foil events at the 1948 and 1952 Summer Olympics.

References

External links
 

1914 births
1963 deaths
French male foil fencers
Olympic fencers of France
Fencers at the 1948 Summer Olympics
Fencers at the 1952 Summer Olympics
Olympic gold medalists for France
Olympic medalists in fencing
Fencers from Paris
Medalists at the 1948 Summer Olympics
Medalists at the 1952 Summer Olympics